Top of the Line is the third studio album by American rapper Rittz. The album was released on May 6, 2016, by Strange Music and RBC Records.

Singles
On March 25, 2016, the album's first single "Ghost Story" was released. On April 1, 2016, the album's second single "Propane" featuring Devin the Dude and MJG was released. On April 18, 2016, the album's third single "Inside of the Groove" featuring E-40 and Mike Posner was released.

Artwork
The cover art was created by Canadian artist Pencil Fingerz.

Track listing

Charts

Weekly charts

Year-end charts

References

2016 albums
Rittz albums
Strange Music albums
Albums produced by Seven (record producer)